In the mathematical field of graph theory, an agreement forest for two given (leaf-labeled, irreductible) trees is any (leaf-labeled, irreductible) forest which can, informally speaking, be obtained from both trees by removing a common number of edges.

Agreement forests first arose when studying combinatorial problems related to computational phylogenetics, in particular tree rearrangements.

Preliminaries 

Recall that a tree (or a forest) is irreductible when it lacks any internal node of degree 2. In the case of a rooted tree (or a rooted forest), the root(s) are of course allowed to have degree 2, since they are not internal nodes. Any tree (or forest) can be made irreductible by applying a sequence of edge contractions.

An irreductible (rooted or unrooted) tree  whose leaves are bijectively labeled by elements of a set  is called a (rooted or unrooted) -tree.

In the case of rooted -trees, the isomorphism must also preserves the root.

This  subtree needs not be a -tree, because it might not be irreductible.

Agreement forests 

Therefore, an agreement forest can either be seen as a partition of the taxon set  or as a forest (in the classical graph-theoretic sense) of restricted subtrees.

The size of an agreement forest is simply its number of components. Intuitively, an agreement forest of size  for two phylogenetic trees is a forest which can be obtained from both trees by removing  edges in each tree and subsequently suppressing internal nodes of degree .

Rooted case

Acyclic agreement forests 

A raffinement on the above definition can be made, resulting in the concept of acyclic agreement forest.

Another characterization of acyclicity in agreement forest is to consider the directed graph  that has vertex set  and a directed edge  if and only if  and at least one of the two following conditions hold:

The directed graph  is called the inheritance graph associated with the agreement forest , and we call  acyclic if  has no directed cycle.

Optimization problems 

In this context, it is the agreement between the two trees which is maximized: it explains why computing a maximum agreement forest actually means minimizing its number of components. This leads to two different (but related) optimization problems.

 maximal ≠ maximum
 unrooted MAF corresponds to TBR
 rooted MAF corresponds to rSPR
 acyclic MAF corresponds to HYB
 AFs can be defined on non-binary trees
 AFs can be defined on more than two trees
 acyclic agreement forests have a role to play in the computation of HYB on 3 or more trees, but the relationship is much weaker than in the case of 2 trees
 Complexity
 FPT algorithms
 Approximation algorithms
 Exponential time algorithms

Notes 

Trees (graph theory)